Rodney David Carter Whiteman (born 6 October 1940) is a British Anglican priest. He was Archdeacon of Bodmin from 1989 to 1999, and Archdeacon of Cornwall from 2000 to 2005.

Whiteman was born in Par, Cornwall, England. He was educated at St Austell Grammar School, Pershore College of Horticulture, and Ely Theological College.

Whiteman was ordained deacon in 1964, and priest in 1965. After a curacy at Kings Heath, he held incumbencies in Rednal (1970–1979) and Erdington (1979–1989). He then served as Archdeacon of Bodmin from 1989 to 1999 and as Archdeacon of Cornwall from 2000 to 2005.

References

1940 births
Living people
Alumni of Ely Theological College
Archdeacons of Bodmin
People from Tywardreath and Par
People educated at St Austell Grammar School
Alumni of Pershore College of Horticulture